Archeparchy of Damascus may refer to:
 Maronite Catholic Archeparchy of Damascus
 Syriac Catholic Archeparchy of Damascus
 Melkite Greek Catholic Archeparchy of Damascus